Mikhail Nikolayevich Smirnov (1881 in Moscow – 1957) was an association football player. Smirnov made his debut for Russia on June 30, 1912 in a 1912 Olympics game against Finland.

References

External links
  Profile

1881 births
1957 deaths
Footballers at the 1912 Summer Olympics
Olympic footballers of Russia
Russia international footballers
Russian footballers
Association football forwards